The 2021–22 Coppa Titano was the sixty-fourth edition of the football competition in San Marino. The winners of the cup, Tre Fiori qualified for a place in the 2022–23 UEFA Europa Conference League.

La Fiorita were the defending champions after winning the previous season's cup by defeating Tre Fiori on penalties. Defending champions La Fiorita were knocked out in the semi-finals. In the final, Tre Fiori defeated Folgore 3–1.

First round
The first legs of the first round were played on 28–29 September 2021 and the second legs were played on 26–27 October 2021. The draw for the first round was held on 30 August 2021. La Fiorita received a bye in the first round.

|}

Quarter–finals
The first legs of the quarter–finals were played on 24 November 2021 and the second legs were played on 8 December 2021.

|}

Semi–finals
The two legs of the semi–finals were played on 24 and 27 April 2022.

|}

Final
The final was played on 30 April 2022.

See also
 2021–22 Campionato Sammarinese di Calcio

References

External links
 official site (Italian)
 uefa.com

Coppa Titano seasons
San Marino
Coppa Titano